Phylace or Phylake (Phylakē), or Phylaces or Phylakes (Φυλακές, Phylakēs), or Phylacae or Phylakai (Φυλακαὶ, Phylakaí), was a city in mountainous ancient Pieria, Macedon, on the Haliacmon river, north of Balla. Parmenion, son of Glaucias, Phylacean was a dolichos runner and winner in the Alexandrian games at Beroea in 3rd or 2nd century BCE (dedicated to Alexander the Great). Pliny mentions the inhabitants under the name Phylacaei.

Its site is unlocated.

Notes

References

 Hazlitt, The Classical Gazetteer > page 274

Cities in ancient Macedonia
Populated places in ancient Macedonia
Geography of ancient Pieria
Former populated places in Greece
Lost ancient cities and towns